Ivar Valentin Johansson (31 January 1903 – 4 August 1979) was a Swedish wrestler who competed at the 1928, 1932 and 1936 Summer Olympics. In 1932 he won the gold medal in the Greco-Roman welterweight and freestyle middleweight events. Four years later he won the gold medal in the Greco-Roman middleweight competition.

Career
At the 1932 Olympics Johansson first competed as a freestyle middleweight. Despite being a favorite, he lost his first bout to Kyösti Luukko. Yet he won his all other bouts by fall, while Luukko lost in the semifinals and finished second. Two days later he was scheduled to compete as a Greco-Roman welterweight. For this purpose he shed five kilograms of bodyweight by fasting and sweating in a sauna, yet relatively easily won all four bouts. Later the same year he was awarded the Svenska Dagbladet Gold Medal.

Johansson never competed at the world championships. At the European championships he won nine titles in 1931–1939, six in Greco-Roman and three int freestyle wrestling.

Johansson grew up in a rural area near Norrköping, where he built his strength by manual labor at a farm. He then moved to Norrköping city to work as a police officer and then as a wrestling coach. The annual wrestling award "Ivars Guldsko" was established in Sweden in his honor after his death.

References

External links
 

1903 births
1979 deaths
Sportspeople from Norrköping
Swedish male sport wrestlers
Olympic wrestlers of Sweden
Wrestlers at the 1928 Summer Olympics
Wrestlers at the 1932 Summer Olympics
Wrestlers at the 1936 Summer Olympics
Olympic gold medalists for Sweden
Olympic medalists in wrestling
Medalists at the 1936 Summer Olympics
Medalists at the 1932 Summer Olympics
European Wrestling Championships medalists